Pompei: The Legend of Vesuvius, also known as TimeScape: Journey to Pompeii in North America, is a 2000 historical adventure game. The game was developed by Arxel Tribe and Réunion des Musées Nationaux, and published by Cryo Interactive. It is followed by a sequel, Jerusalem: The Three Roads to the Holy Land.

Plot 
When an explorer and world famous cartographer by the name of Adrien Blake returns from an expedition he discovers that his fiancée, Sophia has disappeared. Wrought with grief Adrian immerses himself in his manuscripts and reveals an ancient curse placed on him by the goddess Ishtar. Blake must go to 79 AD Pompeii, where a volcano will erupt in four days time, destroying the city, and find Sophia.

Development 
Pompei used the CINview engine, which also appeared in Faust.

Reception 

According to Cryo Interactive's marketing manager, Mattieu Saint-Dennis, Pompei sold 90,000 units in Europe alone by December 2000. Of this number, France accounted for 30,000 copies.

Tom Houston of Just Adventure praised its story, graphics, and puzzles while deeming it on par with Egypt 1156 B.C., China, and Aztec. Meanwhile, the site's Ray Ivey gave the game a D, commenting that the experience left him "grumpy for days". Gamespy's Tamara Schembri positively compared it to Beyond Atlantis due to the former seamlessly blending its education and entertainment. Michael Lafferty of GameZone thought the title had a wide appeal as a family adventure game with a rich story.

References

External links 
Official site
 Pompei: The Legend of Vesuvius at Microïds (archived from here)

2000 video games
Arxel Tribe games
Classic Mac OS games
Cryo Interactive games
DreamCatcher Interactive games
First-person adventure games
History educational video games
Microïds games
Point-and-click adventure games
Pompeii in popular culture
Single-player video games
Video games about time travel
Video games developed in Slovenia
Video games set in the Roman Empire
Windows games
Works set in the 1st century